Marcus Daniell and Aisam-ul-Haq Qureshi were the defending champions but only Qureshi chose to defend his title, partnering Divij Sharan. Qureshi lost in the quarterfinals to Alex Bolt and Lleyton Hewitt.

Luke Bambridge and Jonny O'Mara won the title after defeating Ken and Neal Skupski 7–6(13–11), 4–6, [10–7] in the final.

Seeds

Draw

References
 Main Draw

Fuzion 100 Surbiton Trophy - Men's Doubles
2018 Men's Doubles